was a Japanese nature photographer.

Life and career

Tominari was born on August 17, 1919, in Shimonoseki, Yamaguchi Prefecture. Graduating in 1942 from Tōkyō Bijutsu Gakkō (now Tokyo University of the Arts), by the 1960s he had begun to specialize in plant photography. He also painted.

In 1975 Tominari established a photography company in Sendagaya, Tokyo. For the following three years he photographed for an encyclopedia, published by Asahi Shinbun-sha, of the plants of the world: Asahi hyakka: Sekai no shokubutsu. He contributed to fifty photographically illustrated guides to plants and similar works. He was awarded the 1990 Japan Picture Book Awards Grand Prize for his photo collection . He died at the age of 73 on September 25, 1992, in Tokyo.

Collections
Seventeen of Tominari's photographs are in the collection of the Tokyo Metropolitan Museum of Photography.

Books with photography by Tominari
Hana no techō: No no hana. Tokyo: Kodansha, 1968. Photography by Tominari.
Kisetsu no hana: Utsukushii hana no miryoku. Tokyo: Jitsugyō-no-Nihon-sha, 1968.
Nihon no kaboku. Tokyo: Kodansha, 1971. Photography by Tominari.
Gendai tsubaki-shū: Tominari Tadao shashin. Tokyo: Kodansha, 1972.
Tsutsuji, satsuki, shakunage. Tokyo: Kodansha, 1974. Photography by Tominari.
Genshoku sansai. Tokyo: Ie-no-hikari Kyōkai, 1974. Photography by Tominari.
Tokyo: Yama-to-keikoku-sha, 1978. . By Tominari.
Kiyose: Kusaki hana. 7 vols. Tokyo: Asahi Shinbunsha, 1979–80. Photography by Tominari.
1982-ki. Tokyo: Tokyo Editorial Center, 1982. . By Tominari.
Kigi hyakkasen. Tokyo: Asahi Shinbun-sha, 1989. . Photography by Tominari.
Fuyume gashōdan. Tokyo: Fukuinkan Shoten, 1990. . Co-photographed by Tominari.
Neichā wārudo: Chikyū ni ikiru / Nature World: Life on Earth. Tokyo: Tokyo Metropolitan Museum of Photography, 1997. Catalogue of an exhibition of the work of various photographers, with texts and captions in Japanese and English.

References

External links
 Tadao Tominari at J'Lit Books from Japan 

Japanese photographers
1919 births
1992 deaths
People from Shimonoseki
Nature photographers